Southridge Mall is an open-air shopping center on the south side of Des Moines, Iowa, United States. It attracts roughly 3.3 million visitors per year, with a primary trade area consisting of most of the city of Des Moines and areas to its south and east.

The mall's anchor stores are Target, Marshalls, Shoe Carnival, and Ross Dress for Less. There are 3 vacant anchor stores that were once Younkers, Sears, and Party City. Tenants on the outparcels include Hy-Vee, PETCO, and a 12-screen theater owned by AMC Theatres.

History
On March 6, 1972, General Growth Properties announced plans to build a new mall at the intersection of Southeast 14th Street and Army Post Road. The mall was known as Army Post Plaza during the planning and construction stages, but it was renamed Southridge Mall shortly before construction was completed.

Southridge Mall opened on October 15, 1975, two months after Valley West Mall opened in West Des Moines. Younkers was the first anchor to open, with Sears following in 1977. An expansion in 1978 added Montgomery Ward as a third anchor, while a Richman Gordman department store became the mall's fourth anchor in 1982. Plans to add Dillard's to Southridge in 1987 were immediately opposed by Younkers, who claimed that the store's lease limited Southridge to four department stores. Younkers sued Southridge's management over this issue, but a federal magistrate ruled against Younkers in June 1990 even though Dillard's backed out of its plan to build at Southridge before the ruling. After the failure to attract Dillard's, Target became the mall's fifth anchor in 1992 while the rest of the mall was renovated; the expansion increased Southridge's floor space to just over 1 million square feet (93,000 m2). Richman Gordman closed in 1992 after the chain declared bankruptcy, and JCPenney moved from downtown Des Moines to Southridge two years later to replace that anchor spot. Montgomery Ward closed its stores at Southridge and Merle Hay Malls during that chain's first round of bankruptcy in 1999, and Wards' 109,000-square foot (10,100 m2) space at Southridge remained vacant until it was demolished in April 2006. On January 24, 2011, it was announced that JCPenney would close its store in June 2011, though one JCPenney store in Des Moines at Valley West Mall would remain open.

General Growth Properties, which was originally based in Des Moines, sold Southridge to the Equitable Life Assurance Society in 1984 as part of its real estate investment trust liquidation that year. General Growth continued to manage Southridge until a partnership of the Simon Property Group and Macerich acquired the mall in March 1998 as part of a 12-mall deal. Macerich manages the mall as part of the deal.

The occupancy rate at Southridge declined in the 2000s, as competition from Jordan Creek Town Center and other shopping areas such as Merle Hay Mall affected the mall's business. Renovation work in late 2006 and 2007 resulted in a new children's play area in the food court, Wi-Fi access, new seating areas, and remodeled restrooms. Steve & Barry's opened a new  store near JCPenney on October 24, 2007, but that store closed at the end of 2008 as the chain liquidated its remaining stores. By December 2009, 40 out of 91 inline store spaces were reported as vacant. Some of the empty storefronts at Southridge had been filled with tenants that are not usually associated with malls, such as churches, offices and an animal shelter. In 2009, U.S. News & World Report named Southridge as one of 84 "endangered malls" due to its low sales per square foot and vacancy rate.

On May 3, 2016, Sears announced that they would be closing in August 2016.

On April 18, 2018, Younkers announced that they would close its location, as the parent, Bon-Ton Stores, was going out of business. The store closed on August 29, 2018. This left Target as the only remaining anchor.

Renovations
In 2012, renovations began on converting most of the mall to outdoor-facing retail. 296,000 square feet of retail space was demolished in the process, with Foot Locker, Shoe Carnival, T-Mobile and Rue 21 opening in the outdoor segment that replaced it. Des Moines Area Community College has also expressed interest in opening a campus in the former JCPenney building. Marshalls opened in the outdoor section in 2013, while a consignment shop called Value Villa opened in the former Steve & Barry's. A college also replaced the former JCPenney.

References

External links
 Southridge Mall's website

Shopping malls in Iowa
Buildings and structures in Des Moines, Iowa
Economy of Des Moines, Iowa
Macerich
Shopping malls established in 1975
Tourist attractions in Des Moines, Iowa
1975 establishments in Iowa